Mikhail Vavich was a Russian actor, operetta and singer.

Biography
Mikhail first performed in 1905 on stage at St. Petersburg in a private operetta of Petr Tumpakov. He received recognition in 1906 after performing the role of the Viscount Cascada in the operetta The Merry Widow by Lehar. From 1905 thru 1918 he worked in the operetta theaters of St. Petersburg and Moscow. From the season of 1908/1909 Vavitch became an actor of a troupe of the Moscow theater, Hermitage. In 1914 he married the drama actress Tatyana Pavlova, with her he acted in several movies.
In 1918, he emigrated to Europe. At the beginning of the 1920s, Vavitch moved to the United States, living and working in Los Angeles. Periodically, he appeared in operetta.
During the season of 1922–1923, he participated in the famous revue La Chauve-Souris on Broadway, directed by Nikita Balieff.

In the middle of the 1920s Vavitch started his Hollywood career by acting in many silent movies and soon gained success as a supporting actor.

He died from a heart attack in Hollywood on October 5, 1930, on the road in his own car.

After a traditional ceremony of the Russian Orthodox funeral service the actor was buried at Serbian Orthodox Cemetery in Los Angeles.

Partial filmography

 The Swan (1925)
 Graustark (1925)
 The Crown of Lies (1926)
 The Third Degree (1926)
 The Midnight Sun (1926)
 Valencia (1926)
 Her Man o' War (1926)
 Hotel Imperial (1927)
 Venus of Venice (1927)
 Two Arabian Knights (1927)
 The Devil Dancer (1927)
 The Gaucho (1927)
 The Dove (1927)
 Glorious Betsy (1928)
 The Woman Disputed (1928)
 A Thief in the Dark (1928)
 Wolf Song (1929)
 The Bridge of San Luis Rey (1929)
 The Divine Lady  (1929)
 The Big House (1930)
 A Devil with Women (1930)
 War Nurse (1930)
 La Sevillana (1930)

References

External links
 
 
 

1881 births
1930 deaths
American male film actors
American male silent film actors
20th-century American male actors
Male actors from the Russian Empire
Ukrainian male silent film actors
Soviet emigrants to the United States